Phyllis Ann Fox (born March 13, 1923) is an American mathematician and computer scientist.

Early life and education 
Fox was raised in Colorado. She did her undergraduate studies at Wellesley College, earning a B.A. in mathematics in 1944.

From 1944 until 1946 she worked for General Electric as an operator for their differential analyser project. She earned a second baccalaureate, a B.S. in electrical engineering, from the University of Colorado in 1948. She then moved on to graduate studies at the Massachusetts Institute of Technology, earning an M.S. in 1949 in electrical engineering, and a doctorate (Sc.D.) in mathematics in 1954 under the supervision of Chia-Chiao Lin. During this time, she also worked as an assistant on the Whirlwind project at MIT, under Jay Forrester.

Later career
From 1954 to 1958, Fox worked on the numerical solution of partial differential equations on the Univac, for the Computing Center of the United States Atomic Energy Commission at the Courant Institute of Mathematical Sciences of New York University. In 1958, following her husband, she returned to Forester's system dynamics research group at MIT, where she became part of the team that wrote the DYNAMO programming language.  She then became a collaborator on the first LISP interpreter, and the principal author of the first LISP manual.

In 1963, she moved from MIT to the Newark College of Engineering, where she became a full professor in 1972. During this time, she also consulted for Bell Labs, where she moved in 1973 to work on a highly portable numerics library (PORT). She retired from Bell Labs in 1984.

Recognition
Fox was named a Fellow of the American Association for the Advancement of Science in 1986.

References 

1923 births
American computer scientists
Artificial intelligence researchers
Massachusetts Institute of Technology School of Science alumni
Lisp (programming language) people
Programming language designers
Wellesley College alumni
University of Colorado alumni
New Jersey Institute of Technology faculty
Numerical analysts
American women computer scientists
Women mathematicians
Living people
Scientists at Bell Labs
MIT School of Engineering alumni
Fellows of the American Association for the Advancement of Science
American women academics
21st-century American women